Heros notatus is a species of tropical freshwater cichlid native to Rio Negro and Essequibo River in South America.

Aquarium trade
This species is uncommon in the aquarium trade.

The species generally found in the aquarium trade Heros efasciatus and its man-made color morphs(red and gold) as well as the unspecified H. sp.'rotkeil'.

References

notatus
Taxa named by Sir William Jardine 
Fish described in 1843